The Great Palace Mosaic Museum, is located close to Sultanahmet Square in Istanbul, Turkey, at Arasta Bazaar. The museum houses mosaics from the Byzantine period, unearthed at the site of the Great Palace of Constantinople.

History
The museum hosts the mosaics used to decorate the pavement of a peristyle court, dating possibly to the reign of Byzantine emperor Justinian I (r. 527–565), although more recent analysis hints at a later date, possibly even the reign of Heraclius. It was uncovered by British archaeologists from the University of St Andrews in Scotland during extensive excavations at the Arasta Bazaar in Sultan Ahmet Square in 1935–1938 and 1951–1954. The area formed part of the south-western Great Palace, and the excavations discovered a large peristyle courtyard, with a surface of 1872 m², entirely decorated with mosaics. It was at this point that the Austrian Academy of Sciences, supervised by Prof. Dr. Werner Jobst, undertook to study and preserve the famous palace mosaic and to carry out additional archeological examinations (1983–1997) within the scope of a cooperative project with the Directorate General of Monuments and Museums in Turkey.

Gallery

See also 

List of museums and monuments in Istanbul
Hippodrome of Constantinople

References

External links 

 Official website
Byzantium 1200 | Mosaic Peristyle
Istanbul Mosaic Museum Photos
Some 220 pictures, so most of the scenes

Byzantine mosaics
Museums in Istanbul
National museums in Turkey
Byzantine museums in Turkey
Great Palace of Constantinople
Fatih